The 2017 Washington Redskins season was the franchise's 86th season in the National Football League and the fourth under head coach Jay Gruden. The Redskins ended the season losing eight of the final 13 games after a 2–1 start, failing to improve on their 8–7–1 record from the previous season, and were mathematically eliminated from playoff contention with a loss to the Chargers. This was likely due to the abundance of injuries at key positions and one of the league's toughest schedules.

In Week 2, the Redskins played the Rams in Los Angeles for the first time in 23 years. In addition, this was the last of six seasons that quarterback Kirk Cousins was on the roster, as he would join the Minnesota Vikings in the following offseason.

Offseason

Organizational changes
On January 6, the Redskins fired defensive coordinator Joe Barry, secondary coach Perry Fewell, defensive line coach Robb Akey, and strength and conditioning coach Mike Clark. General manager Scot McCloughan was fired on March 9.

2017 NFL draft

Draft

Notes
 The Redskins swapped 1st round picks in 2016 with the Houston Texans and acquired a second 6th round pick (No. 209th overall) this year. The Redskins also traded their 4th round pick in 2016 to the New Orleans Saints and received a 5th round pick in 2016 and 5th round pick (No. 154th overall) this year. Lastly, the Redskins swapped their 5th round pick from 2016 for the 4th round pick (No. 114th overall) this year from the New York Jets.

Staff

Final roster

Preseason

Regular season

Schedule

Note: Intra-division opponents are in bold text.

Game summaries

Week 1: vs. Philadelphia Eagles

With the loss, the Redskins began the season 0-1, losing their fifth consecutive season opener. They also had their 5-game winning streak against the Eagles snapped.

Week 2: at Los Angeles Rams

Thanks to a 220-yard day from the running game, Cousins's late touchdown pass to Ryan Grant and a late interception by Mason Foster, the Redskins started the season 1-1 for the first time since 2015.

Week 3: vs. Oakland Raiders

Week 4: at Kansas City Chiefs

Week 6: vs. San Francisco 49ers

Week 7: at Philadelphia Eagles

With the loss, the Redskins fell 3-3 and were swept by the Philadelphia Eagles for the first time since 2013.

Week 8: vs. Dallas Cowboys

Week 9: at Seattle Seahawks

Week 10: vs. Minnesota Vikings

Week 11: at New Orleans Saints

The Redskins suffered a loss to the Saints after going up 31–16 with 5:58 remaining in the fourth quarter. In under three minutes Drew Brees and the Saints offense rallied back to tie the game 31–31 with 1:05 left in the fourth. In overtime, Saint's kicker Wil Lutz kicked the game-winning field goal from 28 yards away, handing the Redskins their most devastating loss of the season.

Week 12: vs. New York Giants
NFL on Thanksgiving Day

The Redskins won on Thanksgiving Day for the first time since 2012 and their third time ever. Kirk Cousins threw a pick six to Janoris Jenkins, who suffered a season-ending injury on the play, to tie the game at 10. The Giants defense hung tough until Cousins and Josh Doctson broke through in the final minutes of the game.

This was Eli Manning's 210th consecutive and final start before infamously being benched for Geno Smith for one game. He was the second quarterback to ever start 210 consecutive games and has since been passed by Philip Rivers.

Week 13: at Dallas Cowboys

Week 14: at Los Angeles Chargers

With the loss, the Redskins were eliminated from playoff contention for the second consecutive season.

Week 15: vs. Arizona Cardinals

Week 16: vs. Denver Broncos

Week 17: at New York Giants

Standings

Division

Conference

References

External links

 

Washington
Washington Redskins seasons
2017 in sports in Maryland